Berserker is the sixth solo studio album by English new wave musician Gary Numan, released on 9 November 1984, it was his first album to be released under Numan's own record label, Numa Records.

Overview
Gary Numan's recording contract with his previous record label Beggars Banquet had ended with the release of 1983's studio album, Warriors. Disillusioned with record companies, Numan decided to create his own record label, Numa Records, to give himself full control over his recordings, production and marketing. Numan was now free to take his music into a harder direction without interference.

Berserker presented a harder synth, hi-NRG-inspired rock sound than Numan's previous studio albums, with an abundant use of sampling and the distinctive sound of the PPG Wave synthesiser. It developed on the electro-funk sound of Warriors, marking a change from the prominent fretless bass on his previous three studio albums but retaining the female backing vocals and occasional saxophone.

Lyrically, the album has a haunting, dystopian theme:

The poignant track "A Child with the Ghost" was Numan's tribute to his friend and former bassist Paul Gardiner, who died in February 1984 from a heroin overdose. The track was also covered by the duo Tik and Tok on their studio album Intolerance (which featured Numan) the same year. The industrial undertones of the Berserker album would be more fully explored on Numan's next studio album, The Fury (1985).

Numan appeared on the cover (and throughout the subsequent tour) as a white-skinned, white-clad "Iceman" with blue makeup and hair. The album was named after a series of science-fiction novels by Fred Saberhagen, which Numan had read at school.

The title track was released as a single in October 1984, but only made it to No. 32 on the UK Singles Chart; his lowest-charting single at that time, alongside "Sister Surprise" from the preceding studio album Warriors. The album was released one month later, but only managed No. 45 on the UK Albums Chart, making it Numan's first studio album to miss the UK top 30. In chart terms, Berserker was outperformed by The Plan, an archival compilation album of early Numan material released by his former record label Beggars Banquet in September 1984 that reached No. 29. "My Dying Machine" was released as the second and final single off Berserker in December of the same year and peaked at No. 66.

Different releases
The album was originally released in two different-length versions in the UK. The CD and cassette releases featured longer versions of all tracks, while the LP features shorter mixes.

The album was not released in the United States until 1998 when Cleopatra Records issued all Numa Records-era Numan studio albums with altered artworks and additional bonus tracks. The Berserker reissue featured four bonus tracks, including extended mixes of the title track and "My Dying Machine". The artwork used a different typeface from the original and the colours were slightly more purple-tinted than on the original. The rear artwork uses a unique composite from the original Numa CD (first issue). The booklet contains the lyrics together with live photos (also on the inner tray) taken in the Edinburgh Playhouse in 1984.

In 1999 the album was reissued in the UK by Eagle Records. This version maintained the original artwork but added five B-sides and outtakes as bonus tracks, and unlike the US reissue, it included liner notes. The album has been long out of print on CD, and today second-hand copies are often listed for sale for £50 or more.

The Berserker Tour
Numan's 19-date UK Berserker Tour of November–December 1984 featured a stylized "high-tech Roman temple" stage set to complement Numan's white leather jacket/white make-up/blue-hair look. The tour spawned a double-album, White Noise, recorded live at the Hammersmith Odeon in December 1984. The same concert was captured (albeit in edited form) on the video The Berserker Tour; both the album and the video were released in 1985. In early 2008, the video of the entire concert was released for the first time, on the DVD Cold Warning. The DVD contains, as an extra feature, a 2007 interview in which Numan discusses his recollections of the Berserker album and tour. Numan mentions that Berserker was influenced by Trevor Horn's production work with Frankie Goes to Hollywood, and claims that distribution problems and a lack of media airplay contributed to its disappointing sales.

Track listing
All songs written by Gary Numan.

All timings are approximate and will vary slightly with different equipment.

1984 Numa vinyl release (NUMA 1001)
 "Berserker" – 5:52
 "This Is New Love" – 6:19
 "The Secret" – 5:55
 "My Dying Machine" – 5:37
 "Cold Warning" – 6:01
 "Pump It Up" – 4:45
 "The God Film" – 4:42
 "A Child with the Ghost" – 3:04
 "The Hunter" – 4:32

1991 Numa CD reissues  (NUMACD 1001)
 "Berserker" – 6:46
 "This Is New Love" – 8.48
 "The Secret" – 6:45
 "My Dying Machine" – 9:23
 "Cold Warning" – 7:03
 "Pump It Up" – 4:51
 "The God Film" – 4:44
 "A Child with the Ghost" – 4:04
 "The Hunter" – 6:48
 Original copies have no barcode and the CD printing is in blue. The second NUMA reissue is barcoded, has a different rear picture sleeve and the CD printing is in black. The catalogue numbers are identical.

1999 Cleopatra U.S. CD reissue  (CLP 0536-2)
 "Berserker" – 5:52
 "This Is New Love" – 6:19
 "The Secret" – 5:55
 "My Dying Machine" – 5:37
 "Cold Warning" – 6:01
 "Pump It Up" – 4:45
 "The God Film" – 4:42
 "A Child with the Ghost" – 4:04
 "The Hunter" – 4:32
 "Berserker" (Extended) – 6:47
 "Empty Bed, Empty Heart" – 3:12
 "My Dying Machine" (Extended) – 9:23
 "Here Am I" – 5:46

1999 Eagle Records UK CD reissue  (EAMCD072)
 "Berserker" – 5:52
 "This Is New Love" – 6:19
 "The Secret" – 5:55
 "My Dying Machine" – 5:37
 "Cold Warning" – 6:01
 "Pump It Up" – 4:45
 "The God Film" – 4:42
 "A Child with the Ghost" – 4:04
 "The Hunter" – 4:32
 "Empty Bed, Empty Heart" – 3:12
 "Here Am I" – 5:46
 "She Cries" – 6:01
 "Rumour" – 2:50
 "This Ship Comes Apart" – 4:01

"Rumour", although a Numan solo track for the Berserker sessions, was also the B-side to the "London Times" single with Radio Heart in 1987.
"She Cries", a B-side on the "My Dying Machine" single, was a remixed demo from the I, Assassin (1982) album sessions.
"A Child with the Ghost" was also recorded by Tik and Tok, appearing on their Intolerance album.
"Pump It Up" was also recorded by Caroline Munro as "Pump Me Up" and released as a single on Numan's Numa label.

Personnel
Credits are adapted from the Berserker liner notes.

Musicians
 Gary Numan – vocals, keyboards
 Chris Payne – viola, keyboards
 Cedric Sharpley – drums
 Russell Bell – guitar
 John Webb – keyboards, programming
 Martin Elliott – bass
 Andy Coughlan – bass (on 'Cold Warning')
 Pat Kyle – saxophone
 Tessa Niles – backing vocals
 Tracy Ackerman – backing vocals
 Zaine Griff – backing vocals (on 'The Secret')
 Mike Smith – PPG Wave programming
 Ian Herron – PPG Wave programming

References

External links
 

Gary Numan albums
1984 albums